A green company claims to act in a way which minimizes damage to the environment.

As global warming continues apace and becomes an increasingly prevalent topic amongst world governments, many companies are doing their part to become environmentally more responsible or "green".

Examples

Automotive
A number of major auto companies have developed alternative fuel vehicles and all-electric vehicles in a move to reduce  petroleum consumption. Technologies include compressed natural gas, Fuel cell vehicles, Battery electric vehicles, and Hybrid electric vehicles.

Aviation
The environmental impact of aviation is significant, though a number of companies are working on mitigation of aviation's environmental impact through new technologies including aviation biofuel.

Doors and Garage Doors
Pella, Masonite, Marvin, Jeld-Wen and other top door manufacturers claim that their entry doors meet Energy Star requirements. Entry doors represent an important source of energy waste in buildings. Ultimately, doors are an important cause of carbon emissions (buildings account for about 41% of our primary energy consumption and an almost equivalent amount of  emissions).

Petroleum
Suncor, a Canadian-based oil company, was named a top performer among 23 global petroleum-producing firms with its environmentally responsible greenhouse gas management programs.

Household
S.C. Johnson Company, maker of household items such as Windex and Ziploc plastic bags was environmentally aware long before it became popular to be so. Using its innovative "Greenlist" process which serves to evaluate what environmental impact certain raw materials used in producing its products can have, S.C. Johnson has been able to eliminate some 1.8 million pounds of volatile organic compounds and 4 million pounds of polyvinylidene chloride from commonly used household items.

Small-business partnerships
In 2009, Atlanta's Virginia-Highland became the first carbon-neutral zone in the United States. This partnership, developed by Verus Carbon Neutral, links 17 merchants of the historic Corner Virginia-Highland shopping and dining neighborhood retail district, through the Chicago Climate Exchange, to directly fund the Valley Wood Carbon Sequestration Project (thousands of acres of forest in rural Georgia).

Controversy

Supporters of green companies claim that it is far more economical to go green than it is to continue adding harmful chemicals to the atmosphere and the environment in general.

Opponents believe that the environmental claims of "green companies" are often exaggerated and have variously raised accusations of greenwashing.  In 2013, The Coca-Cola Company was accused of greenwashing, after marketing a new line of plastic bottles.

See also
Corporate social responsibility

References

Sources
 CNNMoney.com
 Green Companies
 Green Company Directory

Environmentalism